Paul Golden (Swish) Saunders (January 12, 1918 – August 8, 2003) was a highly decorated United States Navy submarine sailor who was twice awarded the Silver Star medal during World War II.

Naval career
Saunders enlisted in the Navy in 1936 and served for 26 years before retiring as GMGC(SS) (Chief Gunners Mate Guns, Submarine Service) in 1962.

Saunders qualified in submarines aboard R-4 (SS-81) in 1940 and subsequently served in Barb (SS-220), Cusk (SS-348), Carbonero (SS-337), and Theodore Roosevelt (SSBN-600).

The only landing of US military forces on the island of Japan during hostilities included Saunders. The landing party destroyed a 16-car train on the coastal railway with an explosive charge, using a microswitch under the rails to trigger the explosion.

He was one of the most decorated enlisted men in the Submarine Service, distinguishing himself during World War II while serving on board the Barb.  Saunders made all twelve of Barb’s war patrols, five in the Atlantic and seven in the Pacific and was chief of the boat (COB) for patrols #9–12. He was also COB for the submarines Cusk, Carbonero and Theodore Roosevelt.

He was featured in the book Thunder Below by his USS Barb skipper, Admiral Eugene B. Fluckey.

Awards

During his career, Saunders was awarded the following:

Submarine Qualification pin
Submarine Combat pin
Silver Star with gold star in lieu of second award 
Bronze Star Medal with Combat V
Letter of Commendation with Ribbon (later converted to the Navy Commendation Medal) with Combat V
Presidential Unit Citation with three bronze stars in lieu of additional awards
Navy Unit Commendation
Navy Good Conduct Medal with silver service star
American Defense Service Medal with "A" Device
American Campaign Medal 
European-African-Middle Eastern Campaign Medal with one bronze service star
Asiatic-Pacific Campaign Medal with one silver and two bronze service stars
World War II Victory Medal
National Defense Service Medal
Philippine Liberation Ribbon

Post naval career

Post World War II found Saunders working in the development of the launching systems for KGW-1 Loon, which was an adaptation of the US Army's JB-2 Doodle Bug, Regulus, and Polaris missiles.

Saunders was a member of Submarine Veterans of World War II and also a member of United States Submarine Veterans, Inc., Nautilus Base.

See also

External links
 USS Barb (SS-220), 1942–1954
Photo of Paul Saunders at Naval Historical Center
United States Submarine Veterans, Inc. Eternal Patrol List
Paul Saunders at Sharkhunters International

1918 births
2003 deaths
United States Navy sailors
Recipients of the Silver Star
Military personnel from Richmond, Virginia
People from Dunnellon, Florida
United States Navy personnel of World War II